André Néron (November 30, 1922, La Clayette, France – April 6, 1985, Paris, France) was a French mathematician at the Université de Poitiers who worked on elliptic curves and abelian varieties. He discovered the Néron minimal model of an elliptic curve or abelian variety, the Néron differential, the Néron–Severi group, the Néron–Ogg–Shafarevich criterion, the local height and Néron–Tate height of rational points on an abelian variety over a discrete valuation ring or Dedekind domain, and classified the possible fibers of an elliptic fibration.

Life and career
He was a student of Albert Châtelet, and his PhD students were Jean-Louis Colliot-Thélène and Gérard Ligozat.

He gave invited talks at the International Congress of Mathematicians in 1954 and 1966 . In 1983 the Académie des sciences awarded him the Émile Picard Medal.

He died of cancer in 1985.

Publications

References

External links
Neron on mathoverflow

1922 births
1985 deaths
École Normale Supérieure alumni
Academic staff of the University of Poitiers
20th-century French mathematicians
Algebraic geometers
Number theorists
Deaths from cancer in France
People from Saône-et-Loire